The Signorini problem is an elastostatics problem in linear elasticity: it consists in finding the elastic equilibrium configuration of an anisotropic non-homogeneous elastic body, resting on a rigid frictionless surface and subject only to its mass forces. The name was coined by Gaetano Fichera to honour his teacher, Antonio Signorini: the original name coined by him is problem with ambiguous boundary conditions.

History 

The problem was posed by Antonio Signorini during a course taught at the Istituto Nazionale di Alta Matematica in 1959, later published as the article , expanding a previous short exposition he gave in a note published in 1933.  himself called it problem with ambiguous boundary conditions, since there are two alternative sets of boundary conditions the solution must satisfy on any given contact point. The statement of the problem involves not only equalities but also inequalities, and it is not a priori known what of the two sets of boundary conditions is satisfied at each point. Signorini asked to determine if the problem is well-posed or not in a physical sense, i.e. if its solution exists and is unique or not: he explicitly invited young analysts to study the problem.

Gaetano Fichera and Mauro Picone attended the course, and Fichera started to investigate the problem: since he found no references to similar problems in the theory of boundary value problems, he decided to approach it by starting from first principles, specifically from the virtual work principle.

During Fichera's researches on the problem, Signorini began to suffer serious health problems: nevertheless, he desired to know the answer to his question before his death. Picone, being tied by a strong friendship with Signorini, began to chase Fichera to find a solution: Fichera himself, being tied as well to Signorini by similar feelings, perceived the last months of 1962 as worrying days. Finally, on the first days of January 1963, Fichera was able to give a complete proof of the existence of a unique solution for the problem with ambiguous boundary condition, which he called the "Signorini problem" to honour his teacher. Signorini expressed great satisfaction to see a solution to his question.
A few days later, Signorini had with his family Doctor, Damiano Aprile, the conversation quoted above.

The solution of the Signorini problem coincides with the birth of the field of variational inequalities.

Formal statement of the problem 
Therefore, the body has to satisfy the general equilibrium equations

written using the Einstein notation as all in the following development, the ordinary boundary conditions on 

Obviously, the body forces and surface forces cannot be given in arbitrary way but they must satisfy a condition in order for the body to reach an equilibrium configuration: this condition will be deduced and analyzed in the following development.

The ambiguous boundary conditions 
If  is any tangent vector to the contact set , then the ambiguous boundary condition in each point of this set are expressed by the following two systems of inequalities

or

Let's analyze their meaning: 
Each set of conditions consists of three relations, equalities or inequalities, and all the second members are the zero function.
The quantities at first member of each first relation are proportional to the norm of the component of the displacement vector directed along the normal vector .
The quantities at first member of each second relation are proportional to the norm of the component of the tension vector directed along the normal vector ,
The quantities at the first member of each third relation are proportional to the norm of the component of the tension vector along any vector  tangent in the given point to the contact set .
Knowing these facts, the set of conditions  applies to points of the boundary of the body which do not leave the contact set  in the equilibrium configuration, since, according to the first relation, the displacement vector  has no components directed as the normal vector , while, according to the second relation, the tension vector may have a component directed as the normal vector  and having the same sense. In an analogous way, the set of conditions  applies to points of the boundary of the body which leave that set in the equilibrium configuration, since displacement vector  has a component directed as the normal vector , while the tension vector has no components directed as the normal vector . For both sets of conditions, the tension vector has no tangent component to the contact set, according to the hypothesis that the body rests on a rigid frictionless surface.

The above formulation is general since the Cauchy stress tensor i.e. the constitutive equation of the elastic body has not been made explicit: it is equally valid assuming the hypothesis of linear elasticity or the ones of nonlinear elasticity. However, as it would be clear from the following developments, the problem is inherently nonlinear, therefore assuming a linear stress tensor does not simplify the problem.

The form of the stress tensor in the formulation of Signorini and Fichera 
The form assumed by Signorini and Fichera for the elastic potential energy is the following one (as in the previous developments, the Einstein notation is adopted)

where 
 is the elasticity tensor
 is the infinitesimal strain tensor
The Cauchy stress tensor has therefore the following form

and it is linear with respect to the components of the infinitesimal strain tensor; however, it is not homogeneous nor isotropic.

Solution of the problem 

The potential energy 

The meaning of each of the three terms is the following 
the first one is the total elastic potential energy of the elastic body
the second one is the total potential energy due to the body forces, for example the gravitational force
the third one is the potential energy due to surface forces, for example the forces exerted by the atmospheric pressure
not smooth functions of these class. Therefore, Fichera tries to minimize the functional  in a wider function space: in doing so, he first calculates the first variation (or functional derivative) of the given functional in the neighbourhood of the sought minimizing admissible displacement , and then requires it to be greater than or equal to zero

Defining the following functionals

and

the preceding inequality is can be written as

This inequality is the variational inequality for the Signorini problem.

See also 
 Linear elasticity
 Variational inequality

Notes

References

Historical references 
.
. A brief research survey describing the field of variational inequalities.
. The encyclopedia entry about problems with unilateral constraints (the class of boundary value problems the Signorini problem belongs to) he wrote for the Handbuch der Physik on invitation by Clifford Truesdell.
. The birth of the theory of variational inequalities remembered thirty years later (English translation of the contribution title) is an historical paper describing the beginning of the theory of variational inequalities from the point of view of its founder.
 . A volume collecting almost all works of Gaetano Fichera in the fields of history of mathematics and scientific divulgation.
 ,  (vol. 1),  (vol. 2),  (vol. 3). Three volumes collecting Gaetano Fichera's most important mathematical papers, with a biographical sketch of Olga A. Oleinik.
 . A volume collecting Antonio Signorini's most important works with an introduction and a commentary of Giuseppe Grioli.

Research works
.
. A short research note announcing and describing (without proofs) the solution of the Signorini problem.
. The first paper where aa existence and uniqueness theorem for the Signorini problem is proved.
 . An English translation of the previous paper.
.
.

External links 

  Alessio Figalli,  On global homogeneous solutions to the Signorini problem,

Calculus of variations
Continuum mechanics
Elasticity (physics)
Partial differential equations